Grevillea extorris is a species of flowering plant in the family Proteaceae and is endemic to the west of Western Australia. It is an erect shrub with linear or narrowly oblong leaves and clusters of pink to red or yellow flowers.

Description
The edges of the leaves are turned down or rolled under, the upper surface of the leaves silky-hairy at first, later glabrous, the lower surface silky-hairy or obscured.

Taxonomy
Grevillea extorris was first formally described in 1889 by Spencer Le Marchant Moore in the Journal of the Linnean Society, Botany. The specific epithet (extorris) means "banished", referring to the inhospitable places in which this species grows.

Distribution and habitat
This grevillea grows in low woodland or shrubland, near creeks and on rocky slopes from near Mullewa to Lake Darlot and from Cue to Mount Jackson in the Avon Wheatbelt, Coolgardie, Great Victoria Desert, Murchison and Yalgoo biogeographic regions of western Western Australia.

Conservation status
Grevillea exposita is listed as "not threatened" by the Government of Western Australia Department of Biodiversity, Conservation and Attractions.

See also
 List of Grevillea species

References

extorris
Proteales of Australia
Eudicots of Western Australia
Taxa named by Spencer Le Marchant Moore
Plants described in 1889